Daidō Kenji (大道 健二) (born August 21, 1982 as Kenji Nakanishi) is a former professional sumo wrestler (rikishi) from Katsushika, Tokyo, Japan. He made his debut in 2005, reaching the top division six years later, debuting in the July, 2011 tournament.  His highest rank was maegashira #8. He is now a sumo coach.

Early life and sumo background
At the behest of his older sister, Nakanishi started participating in a sumo club in his neighborhood from 4th grade.  He later participated in inter-high school tournaments.  As a student at Senshu University he won the open weight division championship.  Upon graduating he joined Onomatsu stable and entered the professional sumo ring in March 2005.

Professional career
Nakanishi had a relatively trouble-free rise through the lower ranks.  He took a 7-0 championship in both the jonokuchi and jonidan divisions in his first and second tournaments. He continued to post mostly winning records through 2005 and well into 2006, but began to struggle after reaching the higher ranks of the makushita division.  He would then bounce back and forth between mid to high level makushita ranks, posting alternating winning and losing records, for the next two and a half years.  He finally began to find some equilibrium in mid 2008, posting several consecutive winning tournaments.  This streak was interrupted by a broken jaw that would force him to sit out the March 2008 tournament at what had been his highest rank to date at makushita #5.  Though missing this tournament would send him back to makushita #45 in the next tournament, he did not let this slow him down and upon returning proceeded to post five consecutive winning tournaments, including one playoff loss for the championship in July 2009.

As is often the custom, he chose his entry into jūryō to change his ring name from his family name to his current ring name of Daidō.  The name he said comes from what he sees as the starting place of his way of sumo, his old junior high school, which is named Daidō.  He entered the second tier jūryō division at the same time as Onomatsu stablemate  in March 2010.  This was the first time that two wrestlers from the same stable had been promoted to jūryō simultaneously since Kimurayama and Tochinoshin from Kasugano stable were promoted in January 2008.  Daidō was the third wrestler from Senshu University to achieve sekitori status, following already retired Musoyama and Katayama, the latter of whom was also from the same stable.

He made a smooth entry into jūryō posting two consecutive winning tournaments of 9-6 and 10-5. However, in the wake of an investigation by the national police into illegal baseball gambling by sumo wrestlers, Daidō was one of many wrestlers who admitted involvement.  As punishment by the JSA Daidō was compelled to sit out the July 2010 tournament. This tournament would have been his highest rank yet at jūryō #2. This was an ironic repeat of his "debut" in the top ranks of makushita in 2008 where his injury had forced him to sit out.  As another stipulation of the punishment, Daidō and others implicated were demoted by one division in the following September tournament.  This would put Daidō back to makushita #1.   He would manage a 4-3 winning record in this tournament and return to jūryō in the November tournament.  He achieved three consecutive winning tournaments, interrupted only by the March tournament that was cancelled due to match fixing allegations.  During this period, in the ongoing police investigation into baseball gambling, Daidō was implicated as one of four still active wrestlers who had used a gambling ring operated by then active sumo wrestlers from Onomatsu stable to place bets on baseball. The prosecutor recommended charges, but ultimately no indictments were handed down due to lack of compelling evidence.

Daidō's performance was largely unaffected by the turmoil around the allegations and his successful tournaments earned him promotion to the top tier makuuchi division in July 2011.  He debuted at maegashira #12, but soon ran into trouble, losing most of his early bouts.  However, he improved enough during the second half of the tournament to pull out a 6-9 record. Though it was his first losing tournament since May 2008, it was a good enough result that he was  only demoted to maegashira 15 for the following September tournament.  An 8-7 record would return him to maegashira #12 for the November tournament where he would again achieve a winning record, ensuring a promotion to maegashira 9,  for 2012's opening tournament. However, in his next three tournaments he narrowly failed to achieve winning records, with a 6–9 and two consecutive 7–8s. A disastrous 1–14 record in the July 2013 tournament saw him demoted back to the jūryō division, and he was never to return to makuuchi.

Retirement from sumo
Daidō dropped out of jūryō after the July 2015 tournament, and although he managed an immediate return, he lost sekitori status again after the November 2015 tournament. After scoring only one win in makushita in January 2016, he chose to retire. He remained in the sumo world as a coach at his stable, under the elder name of Onogawa Oyakata. His danpatsu-shiki, or official retirement ceremony was held on June 4, 2016 at the Ryogoku Kokugikan with 480 people in attendance. He revealed at the event that he has been married since December 2014.

In January 2018, he became the owner of the Otowayama kabu, replacing ex-Otowayama Oyakata Kōbō, who had it on loan and left the Japan Sumo Association. In September 2019 he became the new Onomatsu Oyakata and head of the Onomatsu stable, swapping with ex-sekiwake Masurao who left the Sumo Association for health reasons.

Fighting style
Daidō preferred to fight on the opponent's mawashi or belt as opposed to pushing or thrusting. His favoured grip was migi-yotsu, with his left hand outside and right hand inside in his opponent's arms. His most common winning kimarite was uwatenage, or overarm throw, followed by yori-kiri or force out.

Career record

See also
Glossary of sumo terms
List of past sumo wrestlers
List of sumo elders

References

External links
 

1982 births
Living people
Japanese sumo wrestlers
Sumo people from Tokyo